Susan Brind Morrow (born 1958) is an American author and poet.

Morrow was born in Geneva, New York. She attended Barnard College then studied classics as an undergraduate and graduate student at Columbia University in New York. She also studied Arabic and worked intensively on hieroglyphic texts for six years as a student of Egyptology.

Morrow has written three non-fiction books, The Dawning Moon of the Mind (2015), Wolves and Honey: a history of the natural world (2004), and The Name of Things (1997). She also wrote a play, “ Mr. Analogue 200.”

Her first book, The Names of Things: A Passage in the Egyptian Desert, is "travel writing and memoir threaded through with musings on the origins of words" which Annette Kobak says "manages to unlock a sense of the awe and poetry our most ancient ancestors must have felt in naming things for the first time".  The book was partially inspired by the death of her younger brother. It was a finalist for the PEN: Martha Albrand Award for the Memoir in 1998. James Dickey praised her work, comparing it to the work of Stephen Crane, Robert Graves and Freya Stark.

Her second book, Wolves and Honey: a history of the natural world, is an exploratory memoir. Morrow covers many of her interests including theosophy, the Finger Lakes region, the start of Mormonism, and the lasting relationships humans have cultivated with the natural environment, and bee-keeping.

In her most recent book, The Dawning Moon of the Mind, Morrow argues that The Pyramid Texts are the “earliest body of written poetry and religious philosophy in the world”

Morrow was a fellow of the Crane-Rogers Foundation/Institute of Current World Affairs in Egypt and Sudan (1988–90), noted as a prominent member after she dispatched The Dawning Moon of Mind.  She is a 2006 fellow of the Guggenheim Foundation. Morrow also has affiliations with the Lapham’s Quarterly Editorial Board Trustee and wrote an essay published on the website called The Turning Sky which detailed her accounts of translating various Egyptian texts.

She is married to the American essayist Lance Morrow. They live on a farm in Columbia County, New York.

Morrow's most recent event was at The Center of the study of World Religions at Harvard University from October 10 to 11 2018.

Bibliography
 The Names of Things: A Passage in the Egyptian Desert
 Wolves and Honey: A Hidden History of the Natural World
 Home Ground: Language for an American Landscape (contributor)
 Mt. Analogue (2006) (play)
 The Dawning Moon of the Mind: Unlocking the Pyramid Texts (2015)
The Turning Sky (2018)

Honors and awards
 Guggenheim Foundation, Fellow 2006
 Sowell Collection, Texas Tech University, papers purchased 2007
 Pen/Martha Albrand Award for the Art of the Memoir, finalist 1998
 Crane Foundation/Institute of Current World Affairs, Fellow Egypt and Sudan, 1988–90
 New York Institute for the Humanities Fellow
 American Academy of Arts and Letters 2022 Award Winner

References

 https://artsandletters.org/pressrelease/2022-literature-award-winners/

1958 births
Living people
People from Geneva, New York
20th-century American writers
21st-century American writers
Barnard College alumni
20th-century American women writers
21st-century American women writers